Gołębiewo Wielkie  is a village in the administrative district of Gmina Trąbki Wielkie, within Gdańsk County, Pomeranian Voivodeship, in northern Poland.

For details of the history of the region, see History of Pomerania.

The village has a population of 646.

90% speak Polish, 80% Kaszubian, 50% Russian and German, 20% speak English and 6% speak French, Arabic and Algerian and there ethnic group is Kaszubian.

References

Villages in Gdańsk County